The 1933–34 season was Cardiff City F.C.'s 15th season in the Football League. They competed in the 22-team Division Three South, then the third tier of English football, finishing bottom of the division and having to seek re-election.

Season review

Football League Third Division South

Partial league table

Results by round

Players
First team squad.

Fixtures and results

Third Division South

FA Cup

Third Division South Cup

Welsh Cup

Source

References

Bibliography

Cardiff City F.C. seasons
Association football clubs 1933–34 season
Card